Pogar may refer to:

Pogar, Vareš, a populated place in Vareš, Bosnia and Herzegovina
Pogar, India, a village in Aurangabad District, Bihar, India
Pogar, Russia, name of several inhabited localities in Russia